Excelsior Township School District 1 is a K-8 school district in Excelsior Township, Michigan.

The district was established in 1875.

The district has  of area.

Operations
In 2010 there were fifty students, the highest enrollment within a ten-year span.  there were forty students, with twenty-five of them living outside of the district boundaries and attending Excelsior due to the school of choice program; some choose the school due to the low student-teacher ratio. That year there was a combined superintendent and principal, as well as three teachers and one teacher's aide/janitor/counselor.

As of 2016 the yearly budget is $450,000. The district operates a single school bus and provides laptops and iPads, but does not have a regular cafeteria service.

The school does not offer athletics, so students may participate in athletic teams at schools operated by Kalkaska Public Schools and Mancelona Public Schools.

The Traverse Bay Area Intermediate School District supports the district.

References

Further reading
  - Shows map of district boundaries

External links
 Excelsior Township School District 1

School districts in Michigan
1875 establishments in Michigan
Education in Kalkaska County, Michigan
Public K–8 schools in Michigan
One-room schoolhouses in Michigan
School districts established in 1875